The 2008–09 snooker season was a series of snooker tournaments played between 4 June 2008 and 10 May 2009. Four players missed the fourth ranking event of the season, the Bahrain Championship, and therefore lost ranking points; this was due to a clash with some Premier League matches whose date had already been approved by the game's governing body.

New professional players
Countries
 
 
 
 
 
 
 
 
 
 

Note: new means in these case, that these players were not on the 2007/2008 professional Main Tour. 

NGB nominations

From PIOS Tour

Calendar 
The following table outlines the results and dates for all the ranking and major invitational events.

Official rankings 

The top 16 of the world rankings, these players automatically played in the final rounds of the world ranking events and were invited for the Masters.

World ranking points

Points distribution 
2008/2009 Points distribution for world ranking events:

Notes

References

External links
 
Cuefacts 2008/2009 on Global Snooker

2008
Season 2009
Season 2008